The  is the 24th edition of the Japan Film Professional Awards. It awarded the best of 2014 in film which had not received any Japanese award at that time. The ceremony took place on May 9, 2015 at Theatre Shinjuku in Tokyo.

Awards 
Best Film: Hyakuen no Koi
Best Director: Masaharu Take (Hyakuen no Koi)
Best Actress: Fumi Nikaidō (My Man, Hotori no Sakuko)
Best Actor: Sosuke Ikematsu (Love's Whirlpool, Umi o Kanjiru Toki, Otona Drop, Pale Moon)
Best New Director: Yūki Yamato (Otogibanashi Mitai, Count Five to Dream of You)
Best New Actress: Rina Takeda (Iya Monogatari Oku no Hito)
Popularity: Team Telekura Canonball 2013
Special: Tōru Shinagawa (No no Nanananoka)

10 best films
 Hyakuen no Koi (Masaharu Take)
 My Man (Kazuyoshi Kumakiri)
 Hotori no Sakuko (Kōji Fukada)
 Love's Whirlpool (Daisuke Miura)
 No no Nanananoka (Nobuhiko Obayashi)
 Bokutachi no Kazoku (Yuya Ishii)
 Umi o Kanjiru Toki (Hiroshi Ando)
 Nishino Yukihiko no Koi to Bōken (Nami Iguchi)
 Mizu no Koe o Kiku (Masashi Yamamoto)
 Otogi Banashi Mitai (Yūki Yamato)

References

External links
  

Japan Film Professional Awards
2015 in Japanese cinema
Japan Film Professional Awards
May 2015 events in Japan